
Year 641 (DCXLI) was a common year starting on Monday (link will display the full calendar) of the Julian calendar. The denomination 641 for this year has been used since the early medieval period, when the Anno Domini calendar era became the prevalent method in Europe for naming years.

Events 
 By place 

 Byzantine Empire 
 February 11 – Emperor Heraclius, age 65, dies of dropsy at Constantinople after a 31-year reign. He reorganized the imperial administration, but lost Armenia, parts of Egypt, Palestine, Syria and much of Mesopotamia to the Muslim Arabs. Heraclius is succeeded by his sons Constantine III and Heraklonas.
 The Muslim conquest of Egypt continues, with the siege of Alexandria.
 May – Constantine III, age 29, dies of tuberculosis after a four-month reign, leaving his half-brother Heraklonas sole emperor. Rumors spread that Constantine has been poisoned by Heraclius's second wife (and niece) Martina.
 September – The Byzantine Senate turns against Martina and her son Heraklonas, who are both mutilated, and exiled to Rhodes. Supported by general Valentinus, Constantine's son Constans II, age 10, succeeds to the throne. 
 Constans II establishes a new civil-military defensive organisation, based upon geographical military districts. Byzantine forces maintain the frontier, along the line of the Taurus Mountains (Southern Turkey).

 Europe  
 Aega, Mayor of the Palace and regent (alongside of queen mother Nanthild) of Neustria and Burgundy, dies during the reign of King Clovis II. He is replaced by Erchinoald, a relative of Dagobert I's mother.
 The Lombards under King Rothari conquer Genoa (Liguria), and all remaining Byzantine territories in the lower Po Valley, including Oderzo (Opitergium).
 Arechis I, duke of Benevento (northeast of Naples), dies after a 50-year reign and is succeeded by his son Aiulf I. 

 Britain 
 Prince Oswiu of Bernicia conquers Gododdin (or "The Old North") as far north as Manau (modern Scotland), on behalf of his half-brother, King Oswald (approximate date).
 King Bridei II dies after a 5-year reign, and is succeeded by his brother Talorc III as ruler of the Picts.

 Africa 
 November 8 – Siege of Alexandria: Muslim Arabs under 'Amr ibn al-'As capture Alexandria after a six-month siege. Byzantine officials formally capitulate to Amr, turning the city over to Arab hands.
 The city of Fustat (later Cairo) is founded in Egypt. It becomes the first capital of Egypt under Muslim rule.

 Asia 
 Emperor Taizong of the Tang Dynasty (China) instigates a civil war in the Western Turkic Khaganate, by supporting Isbara Yabghu Qaghan.
 November 17 – Emperor Jomei of Japan, age 48, dies after a 12-year reign. 
 Uija becomes the last king of the Korean kingdom of Baekje.

Births 
 Asparukh, ruler (khan) of the First Bulgarian Empire (d. 701)

Deaths 
 February 11 – Heraclius, Byzantine emperor
 November 17 – Emperor Jomei of Japan (b. 593)
 Aega, Mayor of the Palace (Neustria and Burgundy)
 Arechis I, duke of Benevento (Italy)
 Bridei II, king of the Picts
 Emperor Constantine III of the Byzantine Empire 
 Mu, king of Baekje (one of the Three Kingdoms of Korea)
 Ouyang Xun, Confucian scholar and calligrapher (b. 557)
 Zaynab bint Jahsh, wife of Muhammad

References